Guilherme Viana (born May 13, 1986) is a Brazilian mixed martial artist currently competing in Bellator's Light Heavyweight division. A professional competitor since 2012, Viana was a contestant on The Ultimate Fighter: Brazil 3.

Mixed martial arts career

Early career
Viana began his professional MMA career in March 2012. He quickly compiled a 4–1 record, with his lone loss being against former UFC and Bellator competitor Rodney Wallace, before appearing on The Ultimate Fighter: Brazil 3.

The Ultimate Fighter: Brazil 3
In February 2014, Viana was revealed as one of the contestants on The Ultimate Fighter: Brazil 3, competing as a heavyweight. In the fight to get into the house, Viana lost to eventual winner of the heavyweight tournament Antônio Carlos Júnior via TKO in the first round, thus being eliminated from the competition.

Bellator MMA
Viana made his Bellator and United States debut against nine-time UFC veteran Francis Carmont at Bellator 135 on March 27, 2015. Viana lost the fight via unanimous decision.

Viana faced another UFC veteran in Houston Alexander at Bellator 146 on November 20, 2015. He won the fight via TKO due to a doctor stoppage following the conclusion of the second round.

Viana then faced Philipe Lins at Bellator 159 on July 22, 2016. After a conservative first round from both fighters, Viana lost the fight via TKO due to punches in the second.

Personal life
Viana has a brother, who is also a mixed martial artist. He is happily married.

Mixed martial arts record

|-
|Loss
|align=center|7–3
|Philipe Lins
|TKO (punches)
|Bellator 159
|
|align=center|2
|align=center|1:13
|Mulvane, Kansas, United States
|
|-
|Win
|align=center|7–2
|Houston Alexander
|TKO (doctor stoppage)
|Bellator 146
|
|align=center|2
|align=center|5:00
|Thackerville, Oklahoma, United States
|
|-
|Loss
|align=center|6–2
|Francis Carmont
|Decision (unanimous)
|Bellator 135
|
|align=center|3
|align=center|5:00
|Thackerville, Oklahoma, United States
|
|-
|Win
|align=center|6–1
|Julio Cesar dos Santos
|TKO (punches)
|The Hill Fighters 2
|
|align=center|2
|align=center|0:46
|Gramado, Rio Grande do Sul, Brazil
|
|-
|Win
|align=center|5–1
|Cristiano Monteiro
|Submission (rear-naked choke)
|Shooto Brazil 47
|
|align=center|1
|align=center|N/A
|Rio de Janeiro, Brazil
|
|-
|Win
|align=center|4–1
|Ricardo Silva
|TKO (punches)
|Watch Out Combat Show 28
|
|align=center|1
|align=center|N/A
|Gramado, Rio Grande do Sul, Brazil
|
|-
|Loss
|align=center|3–1
|Rodney Wallace
|Decision (split)
|Iron Fight Combat 2
|
|align=center|3
|align=center|5:00
|Aracaju, Sergipe, Brazil
|
|-
|Win
|align=center|3–0
|Ed Carlos
|TKO (punch)
|Iron Fight Combat 1
|
|align=center|1
|align=center|1:19
|Feira de Santana, Bahia, Brazil
|
|-
|Win
|align=center|2–0
|Gustavo Gussem
|TKO (punches)
|Watch Out Combat Show 19
|
|align=center|1
|align=center|1:50
|Rio de Janeiro, Brazil
|
|-
|Win
|align=center|1–0
|Eduardo Camilo
|Submission (armbar)
|MMA Against Dengue 2
|
|align=center|1
|align=center|3:51
|São Gonçalo, Rio de Janeiro, Brazil
|

References

Living people
1986 births
Brazilian male mixed martial artists
Light heavyweight mixed martial artists
Sportspeople from Porto Alegre